MGA Entertainment Inc. (short for Micro-Games America Entertainment; sometimes referred to as MGA) is a manufacturer of children's toys and entertainment products founded in 1979. Its products include Bratz, L.O.L. Surprise!, Num Noms, and Rainbow High.  MGA also owns Little Tikes and animation studio MGA Studios.

MGA is headquartered in a mixed use corporate campus in the Chatsworth area of Los Angeles.
In 2018, the chairman and CEO of MGA Entertainment, Isaac Larian, announced that an Australian office of the business would be opening in early 2019.

Products

Bratz 

Introduced in 2001, Bratz is MGA's most successful product line, with various spin-offs from the original teenage dolls, including miniature versions (Lil' Bratz), kid versions (Bratz Kidz) baby dolls (Bratz Babyz), pets (Bratz Petz), tiny baby dolls with pets (Lil' Angelz), TV series (of the same name), live-action feature film (Bratz: The Movie) and direct-to-video film (Bratz Girlz Really Rock) and numerous DVDs and soundtracks. Because of the lawsuit brought by Mattel against MGA in 2008, the Bratz Kidz and Bratz Lil' Angelz were renamed "4*Ever Kidz" and "4*Ever Lil' Angelz", respectively, before their eventual discontinuation in 2009. They returned in 2010 for their 10th Anniversary with brand new bodies and makeup, which resembled the makeup of the prototypes for the original dolls. In 2013, they were given a new, taller body and a brand new logo. They took a hiatus a year later to rebuild the brand to try and match their original success. They returned, once again, in 2015 with completely new branding, head and body molds, and the return of the original logo. They were met with low sales and dissatisfaction from children and fans alike, and were discontinued again in 2016. They returned in 2018 with a collector line designed by Hayden Williams, and relaunched the original 2001 dolls for their 20th anniversary.

Moxie Girlz and Moxie Teenz

In 2009, a new doll line named Moxie Girlz was introduced. These Moxie girlz are similar, but legally distinct, from the Bratz line of dolls. This is to circumvent the ruling from the lawsuit described below.

The Moxie Girlz were intended to replace Bratz, but when they came back, the Moxie Girlz became a separate line of their own. The line includes Avery, Lexa, Sophina, Bria and more characters, and has been around since 2009. They are similar to the Bratz line, only this line shows more modest fashions that typical tweens would wear.

As of 2021, no Moxie Teenz were made after 2011, and Moxie Girlz were discontinued in 2014. Leftover dolls were made into Moxie Girlz Friends (exclusive to Target) and the Storytime Princess Collection (exclusive to Toys "R" Us).

Lalaloopsy

MGA introduced its Lalaloopsy brand in 2010 accompanied by the tagline "Sew Magical, Sew Cute." Lalaloopsy dolls were once rag dolls who magically came to life when their last stitch was sewn. Each Lalaloopsy doll has a personality reflected by the fabrics used to make them. They live happily together in Lalaloopsy Land, a whimsical world full of fun and surprises around every corner. Each Lalaloopsy doll comes with his or her own pet.

Lalaloopsy dolls stand approximately 13 inches tall. Large dolls include Rosy Bumps 'n' Bruises, Crumbs Sugar Cookie, Dot Starlight, Peanut Big Top, and many more. In Fall 2011, MGA released Suzette La Sweet, a Lalaloopsy collector doll who was sewn from pieces of a duchess' dress.

The Lalaloopsy line includes Littles dolls, the younger brothers and sisters of Lalaloopsy dolls. Just like their older siblings, the Littles magically came to life when their very last stitch was sewn. The Lalaloopsy Littles have their own unique personalities and pets. There are currently over 30 Lalaloopsy Littles dolls, including Matey Anchors (Marina Anchors' brother), Bundles Snuggle Stuff (Mittens Fluff 'n' Stuff's sister), and Scribbles Splash (Spot Splatter Splash's sister). The toy line’s popularity peaked at around 2013.

Also in the Lalaloopsy line are Mini Lalaloopsy, Lalaloopsy Micros, and Accessories. The Accessories line includes outfits and furniture for the Lalaloopsy dolls and Littles dolls, and Mini Lalaloopsy playsets and vehicles.

Lalaloopsy dolls are sold in-store and online at a variety of retailers. On December 7, 2010, Lalaloopsy won the People's Play Award for large dolls.

L.O.L. Surprise!
The toymaker launched the unboxing toy line L.O.L. Surprise! ("Lil Outrageous Littles") on December 7, 2016. The brand became a huge success for MGA and the L.O.L. Surprise doll assortment was the #1 toy for 2017 through November in the US, according to The NPD Group. MGA Entertainment planned to double the sales of L.O.L. Surprise toys in 2018. Several new higher-priced L.O.L. Surprise toys were released over summer including the L.O.L. Surprise House, L.O.L. Amazing Surprise, and the L.O.L. Bigger Surprise!. The L.O.L. Amazing Surprise Playset was a Top 100 toy on Amazon in November 2019, according to Shareably.

The L.O.L. Surprise brand was expanded in 2019 with the addition of the L.O.L. O.M.G. fashion dolls ("Outrageous Millennial Girls"). The new line received the award of Doll of the Year at 2020's Annual Toy Industry Awards in addition to the main L.O.L. Surprise brand winning the Toy of the Year award for a third consecutive year. 2020 saw the introduction of another spin-off line - the L.O.L. J.K. mini fashion dolls which were released during that summer.

The COVID-19 pandemic disrupted production of L.O.L. and threatened supply for the 2020 holidays. 
 In April 2020 a special edition charity doll was announced - named Frontline Hero, one dollar from every sale would go to the company's MGA Entertainment Cares non-profit. 
 L.O.L Surprise is one of MGA’s  most successful toylines.

On October 8, 2021, an animated 47 min feature film, L.O.L. Surprise! The Movie was released on Netflix as an original movie. The film is about Queen Bee, a young girl who finds herself in the popular dolls' CG-animated world, where she must help them create a movie. It is the first feature length film of the L.O.L Surprise franchise. It received mixed-to-average reviews from audiences. Another movie, L.O.L. Surprise! Winter Fashion Show will be released in October 2022.

Three video games, L.O.L Surprise! Remix: We Rule The World (2020), L.O.L Surprise! Movie Night (2021) and L.O.L Surprise! B.B's Born (2022), both developed by Maestro Interactive Games, have been released for the Nintendo Switch platform.

Project Mc2 

Project Mc2 was a product line introduced in 2015. The line included science sets and a doll line which ran from 2015 to 2018. MGA also produced a live-action tie-in series with AwesomenessTV, a division of Viacom, which ran on Netflix from 2015 to 2017, spanning six series. The line's tagline is Smart is the New Cool.

Zapf Creation
On July 20, 2006, MGA acquired a 19.2% minority stake in German toy company Zapf Creation. The deal allowed for MGA to distribute Zapf's products in North America and South America and for Zapf Creation to distribute MGA's products in certain European territories.

Other
Here is a list of products produced by MGA, past and present:

 Air Wars Battle Drones
 America's Next Top Model 
 Awesome Little Green Men
 Belly Busters
 BFC, Ink.
 Bratzillaz (House of Witchez)
 Crate Creatures Surprise
 Dojo Battle
 Dream Ella
 Foamo 
 Gel-a-Peel
 Glam Goo
 Glitter Babyz
 The Hangrees
 HugWallas
 KaChooz
 The Legend of Nara
 Mermaze Mermaidz
 MGA Games
 Moj Moj
 Mooshka
 My Beautiful Mermaid
 Na! Na! Na! Surprise
 Novi Stars
 Num Noms
 Poopsie Slime Surprise
 Rainbow Surprise
 Rainbow High
 Pop Pop Hair Surprise
 Rainbows in Pieces
 Ready 2 Robot
 Rescue Pets
 Secret Crush
 Shakin' Pinball
 Shreddin' Sharks
 Smooshins
 Spider-Man
 Sugar Planet
 Storytime Princess
 Tobi
 Vi and Va
 VIRO Rides
 Who's That Girl?
 Wreck Royale
 Yummi-Land

Miscellaneous
MGA Entertainment also owns Little Tikes, a popular infant, toddler and preschool toy line brand.
During the 1990s, MGA also released handheld versions of various arcade games from Namco (Pac-Man, Ms. Pac-Man, and Mappy), Taito (Space Invaders) and Atari (Centipede, Asteroids and Super Breakout), as well as handheld games based on Navy Seals, Goosebumps, Power Rangers and RoboCop, the latter two are not to be confused with similar handhelds made by Tiger Electronics.

On March 13, 2018, MGA Entertainment confirmed in an email that it had submitted a bid for the Canadian division of Toys "R" Us. Their plan was, with a group of fellow toymakers, to keep some of its more than 700 locations open in Canada. CEO Isaac Larian made a statement during an interview saying "Toys 'R' Us Canada is a good business," and "If there is no Toys 'R' Us, I don't think there is a toy business."

On November 14, 2022, MGA Entertainment acquired Australian animation studio Pixel Zoo and renamed it MGA Studios.

Super Click-It
In 1999, a rival to the Hasbro's Bop It line of games was made by MGA Entertainment under the name Super Click-It, and it was also made under the name Bonk It. It was sold in the UK by Marks and Spencer in 2003.  The game unit has five actions which are Squish It (a double sided yellow button that is pressed), Zip It (a lever that can be pushed up and down), Twist It (an orange knob that looks similar to the Twist It knob from the Bop It Extreme), Blast It (a green fan that when the command is issued will work either by blowing or using one finger to make it work.) and Crack It (an object that is designed to pull backwards and then to normal position). The game has two game modes which are: One Player with Voice Commands (the voice will say: "One Player, Squish It!" when the player presses the Squish It button to select the game mode), One Player with Sound Commands (The voice will say "One Player" with a Squish It sound effect). There are also two two-player game modes which are Two Player Voice Commands and Two Player Sound Commands.

The aim of the game is similar to Bop It where the game gives one command and the player has to obey and perform the action. The game has a maximum score of 100 points and on achieving the maximum score the player is celebrated with a fanfare. In the two player game mode, the game can continue up to 200 points if one player has scored 100 first. In the two player mode, the voice says "Switch" instead of "Pass It". Unlike Bop It, the game gives the player more time to respond to the command. The game doesn't have any screaming sounds when the player performs the wrong action or runs out of time, instead cartoon sound effects are heard such as the wa wa wa wa melody or a slip up sound effect when a cartoon character slips over a banana peel.

Lawsuits over Bratz doll line
On July 17, 2008, the U.S. District Court in Riverside considered to rule a lawsuit between MGA and Mattel to fight over the creation rights of the Bratz doll line. The jury in the case determined that Carter Bryant, creator of the Bratz doll line, had violated his exclusivity contract and had designed the dolls while he was still working at Mattel. Mattel was awarded $100 million US in damages, far less than the $1 billion they were seeking.

On December 3, 2008, U.S. District judge Stephen Larson granted an injunction requested by Mattel, which effectively banned MGA from manufacturing and selling Bratz dolls, though he allowed MGA to continue selling Bratz through the end of the 2008 holiday season. Larson determined that all of MGA's Bratz produced from 2001 through 2008, except for the Kidz and Lil Angelz lines, infringed on Mattel's intellectual property.  Larson allowed MGA to continue to manufacture the Kidz and Lil Angelz lines, provided that they not be promoted under the Bratz brand.  He also stipulated that MGA must, at their own cost, remove all Bratz merchandise from retailers' shelves, reimburse retailers for said merchandise, and turn all recalled product over to Mattel for disposal.  In addition, MGA was to destroy all marketing materials, molds, and other materials that had been used in the manufacture and sale of Bratz.  MGA immediately filed for a permanent stay of the injunction and, on February 11, 2009, was granted a stay through at least the end of 2009.

On December 10, 2009, the U.S. Court of Appeals for the Ninth Circuit granted MGA an immediate stay of the injunction, effectively halting the recall of Bratz product, which was to have begun on January 21, 2010.  In their initial ruling, the Court found Larson's previous ruling to be unusually "draconian", questioned why Mattel had simply been handed ownership of the entire franchise rather than be awarded a stake in the ownership of the franchise or a share of the royalties from future Bratz sales, and ordered MGA and Mattel into mediation.

In April 2011, a federal court jury in Santa Ana, California, awarded MGA $88.4 Million and ruled that MGA didn't steal the idea for Bratz dolls from Mattel or infringe its copyright. Additionally, the jury found Mattel liable for stealing closely held trade secrets from MGA and other toymakers.

Due to a technical procedural issue having nothing to do with the merits of the claims, the Ninth circuit vacated without prejudice the $170 million judgment against Mattel for this misconduct. On January 13, 2014, MGA filed a complaint for these claims in State court in California seeking in excess of $1 billion.

Controversies
The L.O.L. Surprise line of dolls have been criticized for being anatomically correct.

In June 2020, Instagrammer Amina Mucciolo, known as Tasselfairy, alleged a doll in the L.O.L Surprise line called "Rainbow Raver" had plagiarized her likeness from photos posted on social media. MGA denied the allegations stating they "deeply respect the artistic and creative community and would not take from a creator in the way suggested."
MGA founder and CEO Isaac Larian responded to the allegations on Twitter, calling Mucciolo a "Liar and a extortinist[sic] and fraud" and a "disgrace to Black people" and threatening legal action. He later deleted these messages and posted an apology before taking down his Twitter account after receiving backlash.

In August 2020, media outlets reported that L.O.L. Surprise dolls, when dunked in cold water, show what seemed to be lingerie, tattoos, and bondage gear.

References

External links

Doll manufacturing companies
Toy companies of the United States
Manufacturing companies based in Los Angeles
Lake Balboa, Los Angeles
American companies established in 1979
Toy companies established in 1979
1979 establishments in California
Privately held companies based in California